Kim Am (also Gim Am) was a late 8th century Korean astronomer, astrologer, military commander, master of yin-yang and shaman in the Korean Kingdom of Silla.

Biography
He was a descendant (grandson) of General Kim Yushin.

Kim Am studied yin-yang in China in the Chang'an province. He wrote the taoist work, The Principles of Transformation of Substances (Tungap ipsong pop), also translated as Mythical Form of Martial Art (Tungkapbop) or The Principles of Evading Stems (Tun'gap ipsong pop). His Theory of Geomancy (Pung-su-sol) is the earliest recorded reference to geology in Korean science. According to a legend in 769, his prayer caused a storm that killed locusts threatening to cause a famine; this suggests he was also seen as a shaman, similar to some other members of his family. He is also said to have been a master of yin-yang.

In the Kingdom of Silla he was given one or more official positions, whose title is variously translated as the "Savant of Celestial Pheonomena", "Achieved Scholar in Astronomy and Science" (Sachon Paksa) or "Great Professor of Astronomy"; with regard to the latter, while there were others professors of astronomy in Korean history of that era, he was the only one to ever have the moniker "Great" added to his title.

In 797 he was appointed as the envoy to Japan's Nara Court, where he is said to have become one of the favorites of the Japanese Emperor Kōnin. He may have been the same Kim Am who published a book (Ha-do Keui) about his travel to Japan about that time.

He was also a military leader and theorist, commanding the Paegang Garrison, where he is said to have trained his troops in a "six column battle formation". He popularized the Six Defense Strategies (Yukchin Pyongbop).

See also
 Korean shamanism

References

Silla people
8th-century astronomers
Korean military personnel
Korean shamans
Year of birth unknown
Year of death unknown
Korean astrologers
8th-century astrologers
Medieval Korean astronomers